The Penrhyn Castle Railway Museum is a museum of industrial railway equipment, located at Penrhyn Castle near Bangor in Wales.

In the nineteenth century, Penrhyn Castle was the home of the Pennant family (from 1840, the Douglas-Pennants), owners of the Penrhyn slate quarry at Bethesda. The quarry was closely associated with the development of industrial narrow-gauge railways, and in particular the Penrhyn Quarry Railway (PQR), one of the earliest industrial railways in the world. The PQR ran close to Penrhyn Castle, and when the castle was bequeathed to the National Trust in 1951 a small museum of industrial railway relics was created in the stable block.

The first locomotive donated to the museum was Charles, one of the three remaining steam locomotives working on the PQR. Over the years a number of other historically significant British narrow-gauge locomotives and other artifacts have been added to the collection.

Locomotives

See also 
 British narrow-gauge railways

References

External links 
 National Trust

Railway museums in Wales
1 ft 10¾ in gauge railways in Wales
3 ft gauge railways in Wales
4 ft gauge railways in Wales
Museums in Gwynedd
Llandygai
Railway museums in Gwynedd
1951 establishments in Wales
Museums established in 1951
Narrow-gauge railway museums in the United Kingdom